The McKale River is a tributary of the Fraser River in the Canadian province of British Columbia. The river was named in 1913 by surveyor J.A. Walker, after James McKale, a timber cruiser at McBride

Course
The McKale River originates in the Park Ranges of the Rocky Mountains near Interpass Ridge on the continental divide. It flows generally west to join the Fraser River in the Robson Valley portion of the Rocky Mountain Trench, north of McBride.

See also
List of British Columbia rivers

References

Rivers of British Columbia
Tributaries of the Fraser River
Robson Valley
Rivers of the Canadian Rockies